Staffan Lars Anders Tapper (born 10 July 1948) is a Swedish former footballer who played as a midfielder for Malmö FF and the Sweden national team. A full international between 1971 and 1978, he won 36 caps for Sweden and played at the 1974 and 1978 FIFA World Cups.

Career 
Playing for Malmö FF, his career there was successful, becoming Swedish champion in 1974, 1975 and 1977, as well as runner-up in the European Cup 1979 (a 0–1 defeat to Nottingham Forest). He represented the Swedish national team at the 1974 and 1978 World Cups as well as on a number of other occasions. However, many remember him for missing a penalty kick against Poland at the 1974 World Cup. For some time, Tapper was first team coach at Malmö FF, he later resigned from that role to become youth talent coach.

Personal life 
He is the son of Börje Tapper.

Career statistics

International 

 Scores and results list Sweden's goal tally first, score column indicates score after each Tapper goal.

Honours 
Malmö FF

 Allsvenskan: 1974, 1975, 1977
 European Cup runner-up: 1979

References

External links

1948 births
Living people
Swedish footballers
Allsvenskan players
Malmö FF players
1974 FIFA World Cup players
1978 FIFA World Cup players
Sweden international footballers
Malmö FF non-playing staff
Association football midfielders
Allsvenskan managers
Swedish football managers
Footballers from Malmö